Mish Michaels (1968 – c. March 16, 2022) was an American broadcast meteorologist, environmental reporter, and author.

Life and career
Michaels was born in Kolkata, India. She received a Bachelor of Science degree in Meteorology from Cornell University in Ithaca, New York, and a Master's Degree in Technology from Harvard University.

Michaels worked at WHDH and The Weather Channel. Before working at WHDH she spent some time at WMUR-TV in Manchester, NH.  She joined the WBZ-TV weather team in September 2001 and left in July 2009. After leaving WBZ-TV, she spent time raising her children and writing books in her spare time. In late 2010, she contributed to the book, Extreme New England Weather written by Josh Judge, with her story of a deadly microburst in Stratham, New Hampshire, in 1991.

On January 31, 2017, Michaels announced via Twitter her employment with WGBH as a science reporter. As of February 8, 2017, it has been made public that she has been fired from this position as she "...has been outspoken in her controversial belief that vaccines cause autism..." as well as a disbelief in man made climate change. Michaels later disputed these claims on her personal website.

Her family announced her death during the week of March 16, 2022, but no cause of death was given. 
https://latestnews.fresherslive.com/articles/mish-michaels-cause-of-death-how-did-joanna-moore-die-371234

References

1968 births
2022 deaths
20th-century American women
21st-century American women
People from Kolkata
Cornell University College of Agriculture and Life Sciences alumni
Harvard University alumni
Indian emigrants to the United States
American television meteorologists
American women journalists
American writers of Indian descent